Yumeno Garden is the third studio album by Australian indie rock band, Last Dinosaurs. The album was released on October 5, 2018, through Dew Process. Yumeno Garden debuted at number 26 in the Australian ARIA Charts. It's the group's first entirely self-produced album, opting to write, record, and mix in their own studios using consumer equipment and recording software wherever possible, with some guidance from Jean-Paul Fung.

Track listing

Charts

References 

2018 albums
Last Dinosaurs albums
Dew Process albums